Michel Ledoux (born 1958) is a French mathematician, specializing in probability theory. He is a professor at the University of Toulouse.

Ledoux received in 1985 his PhD from the University of Strasbourg with thesis Propriétés limites des variables aléatoires vectorielles which was made under the supervision of Xavier Fernique.

He has done important research on the isoperimetric inequality in analysis and probability theory.

In 2010 he received the Servant Prize of the French Academy of Sciences. In 2014 he was an invited speaker at the International Congress of Mathematicians in Seoul and gave a talk Heat flows, geometric and functional inequalities.

Selected publications
 
  2nd edition 2002

References

External links
Ledoux's homepage at the University of Toulouse
 

1958 births
Probability theorists
20th-century French mathematicians
21st-century French mathematicians
Living people
Functional analysts
University of Strasbourg alumni
Academic staff of the University of Toulouse
Probability Theory and Related Fields editors